Scipio Clint (1805–1839) was an English medallist and seal-engraver.

Life
He was the son of George Clint, A.R.A., the portrait-painter and engraver. He gained a medal at the Society of Arts in 1824. He exhibited at the Royal Academy for the first time in 1825, and in 1830 exhibited there his dies for a medal of Sir Thomas Lawrence. He was appointed medallist to William IV and seal-engraver to Queen Victoria, and was beginning to attain some distinction in his profession when he died on 6 August 1839, aged 34.

Works
Among Clint's medals, which are not numerous, are:

 two of Sir Thomas Lawrence, with heads after the models of Edward Hodges Baily and Samuel Joseph; 
 a medal of Cardinal Wiseman, dated 1836, with reverse, sacred emblems (a specimen, presented by Clint, is in the British Museum); and
 one of the prize medals for Winchester College, having obverse, head of William IV, and reverse, tomb of William of Wykeham.

His medals are signed Clint or S. Clint.

References

Attribution

English engravers
British medallists
1805 births
1889 deaths
19th-century sculptors